Ji Sirji! is an Indian comedy television series, which premiered on 11 November 2015, and is broadcast on BIG Magic and BIG FM 92.7.

Anup Soni is the protagonist in the series. The series is bound together Anup Soni, who himself takes on the position of Boss.

Cast
 Anup Soni
 Gaurav Sharma

References

External links
Official website

2015 Indian television series debuts
Hindi-language television shows
Television shows set in Mumbai
Indian comedy television series
Big Magic original programming
Indian television sketch shows